Erie Township is one of fourteen townships in Miami County, Indiana, United States. As of the 2010 census, its population was 554 and it contained 242 housing units.  The township's only community is Erie.

History
Erie Township was organized on August 27, 1839.  Originally called Black Hawk Township, it was renamed in September 1847 for the Wabash and Erie Canal.  Samuel McClure, a trader who arrived in the fall of 1827, is considered the first European to have entered the area, establishing an Indian trading post on the Abraham Dingman farm.  Settlement began in 1835, encouraged by the new canal.  The Methodists and United Brethren were the first religious organizations in the township, organizing in 1846 and 1849 respectively.

An 1896 history of the county recounts a short description of early life in the area as described by George Nicholson, a pioneer who settled in Erie Township in 1844:
It had been the custom to go to Peru and vote and then spend the day in hilarity.  Intoxicats [sic] were free and spirits high.  There was always a half dozen or more fights during the day.  Some big fellow who felt like a Sampson and Croesus over the effects of some one's treating strutted down the street swinging his arms as big as Pompey and challenged any Democrat to a wrestle... In those early days it was a very dull Saturday if there was not at least one fight.

Geography
Erie Township is the county's smallest civil township by land area.

Erie Township consists of level, open farmland to the north, giving way to an east-west belt of wooded hollows and valleys farther south, and finally bottomland along the Wabash River, which forms the township's southern border with Butler Township.   Daniel Creek, Schrom Creek and several smaller streams flow south into the river.  The township is bordered on the west by Peru Township and on the north by Richland Township.  Its eastern border is with Wabash County.

Unincorporated towns
 Erie at

Major highways
 U.S. Route 24 runs east and west through Erie Township, connecting Peru and Wabash.

School districts
 Peru Community Schools

Political districts
 Indiana's 5th congressional district
 State House District 23
 State Senate District 18

References
 
 United States Census Bureau 2008 TIGER/Line Shapefiles
 IndianaMap

External links
 Indiana Township Association
 United Township Association of Indiana
 City-Data.com page for Erie Township

Townships in Miami County, Indiana
Townships in Indiana